Victor Gurney Logan Van Someren (1886 in Melbourne – 24 July 1976) was a zoologist and entomologist.

Van Someren was born in Australia. He attended George Watson's College and studied zoology at University of Edinburgh. He was also a dentist. Van Someren moved to Kenya in 1912 and lived in Nairobi. He was in the East Africa and Uganda Natural History Society and became Honorary Secretary. In 1930 he became Curator of the Coryndon Museum. Van Someren named a number of bird and butterfly species.

Species named after him include the fish Labeobarbus somereni.

Works
Bird Life in Uganda 
Notes on Birds of Uganda and East Africa
 with Thomas Herbert Elliot Jackson, 1952 The Charaxes etheocles-ethalion complex: a tentative reclassification of the group (Lepidoptera: Nymphalidae). Transactions of the Royal Entomological Society of London 103:257–284.
with Jackson, T.H.E., 1957 The Charaxes etheocles-ethalion complex (Lepidoptera: Nymphalidae). Supplement No. 1. Annals of the Transvaal Museum 23:41–58.
Revisional Notes on the African Charaxes. Pts 1–10 (1963–1975) 652 pages 148 plates. Online at Biodiversity Heritage Library 
Parts 
1963  Revisional notes on African Charaxes (Lepidoptera: Nymphalidae). Part I. Bulletin of the British Museum (Natural History) (Entomology) 195–242.   
1964 Revisional notes on African Charaxes (Lepidoptera: Nymphalidae). Part II. Bulletin of the British Museum (Natural History) (Entomology) 181–235.   
1966 Revisional notes on African Charaxes (Lepidoptera: Nymphalidae). Part III. Bulletin of the British Museum (Natural History) (Entomology) 45–101.    
1967 Revisional notes on African Charaxes (Lepidoptera: Nymphalidae). Part IV. Bulletin of the British Museum (Natural History) (Entomology) 277–316.    
1969 Revisional notes on African Charaxes (Lepidoptera: Nymphalidae). Part V. Bulletin of the British Museum (Natural History) (Entomology) 75–166.    
1970 Revisional notes on African Charaxes (Lepidoptera: Nymphalidae). Part VI. Bulletin of the British Museum (Natural History) (Entomology) 197–250.    
1971 Revisional notes on African Charaxes (Lepidoptera: Nymphalidae). Part VII. Bulletin of  the British Museum (Natural History) (Entomology) 181–226.    
1972 Revisional notes on African Charaxes (Lepidoptera: Nymphalidae). Part VIII. Bulletin of the British Museum (Natural History) (Entomology) 215–264.   
1974  Revisional notes on African Charaxes (Lepidoptera: Nymphalidae). Part IX. Bulletin of the British Museum of Natural History (Entomology) 29 (8):415–487.     
1975 Revisional notes on African Charaxes, Palla and Euxanthe (Lepidoptera: Nymphalidae). Part X. Bulletin of the British Museum of Natural History (Entomology) 32 (3):65–136. 

People educated at George Watson's College
Australian lepidopterists
1886 births
1967 deaths
Australian emigrants to Kenya
Alumni of the University of Edinburgh
20th-century Australian zoologists